The Nablus Sanjak was an administrative area that existed throughout Ottoman rule in the Levant (1517–1917). It was administratively part of the Damascus Eyalet until 1864 when it became part of Syria Vilayet and then the Beirut Vilayet in 1888.

History

Early Ottoman rule

In the 1596- daftar, the Sanjak of Nablus contained the following subdivisions and villages/town:

Nahiya Jabal Sami
Tayasir, 'Aqqaba, Tammun, Tubas, Sir, Talluza, Fandaqumiya, Jaba, Burqa, Zawata, Ijnisinya, Rama, Ajjah, Attil, Kafr Rumman, Shufa, Beit Lid, Saffarin, Yasid Kufeir, Baqa al-Gharbiyye, Ramin, Zemer, Anabta, Bal'a, Qabatiya, Al-Judeida, Arraba, Yabad, Kufeirit, Burqin, Asira ash-Shamaliya, Kafr Qud, Mirka, Siris, Meithalun, Kafr al-Labad, Sanur, Sebastia, Nisf Jubeil, Qusin, Silat ad-Dhahr, Raba, Salhab, Al-Attara, Bizziriya, Fahma, Beit Imrin, Seida, Zawiya

Nahiya Jabal Qubal
Salim, Beit Dajan, Awarta, Einabus, Urif, Al-Lubban ash-Sharqiya, Madama, Iskaka, Aqraba, Zeita Jamma'in, Kifl Hares, Marda, Mas-ha, Haris, Qabalan, Zawiya, Burin, Al-Lubban al-Gharbi, Al-Mughayyir, Salfit, Huwara, Beit Iba, Kafr Thulth, Qarawat Bani Hassan, Jamma'in, Qira, Kafr Qaddum, Khirbet Qeis, Majdal Bani Fadil, Talfit, Duma, Fara'ata, Jit, Bruqin, Beita, Hableh, Balata al-Balad, Farkha, Rafat, Odala, Yasuf, Sarra, Tell, Asira al-Qibliya, Kafr Qallil, Qusra, Jurish, Yanun, Azmut, Osarin, Sarta, Yatma, Al-Muzayri'a, Ammuriya, Immatain, Rantis, Askar (camp), Beit Wazan, Deir Istiya, Jalud, Biddya, Majdal Yaba, As-Sawiya

Nahiya Qaqun
Kafr Rai, Zeita, Tulkarm, Iktaba, Dhinnaba, Zemer, Qaqun

Nahiya Bani Sa'b
Al-Funduq, Jinsafut, Hajjah, Kafr Sur, Al-Jammasin al-Gharbi, Jarisha, Baqat al-Hatab, Falamya, Far'un, Qalansawe, Qalqilyah, Jaljulia, Kafr Saba, Kafr Zibad, Kur, Sir, Jayyous, Kafr Abbush, Kafr Laqif, Islah, Tayibe, Fardisya, Al-Ras, Al-Jammasin al-Sharqi

Later Ottoman rule
In the 19th century, it consisted of nearly 113 towns and villages, in addition to the city of Nablus. From the 17th to the early 20th century it maintained its autonomy of Ottoman rule, mostly due to the mountainous terrain and Nablus's strategic location between Mount Ebal and Mount Gerizim. The rulers of the district composed of several Arab families, some originating from northern Syrian cities, some from Balqa and others were indigenous to Nablus. The primary noble families were the Tuqan, Jarrar, Abd al-Hadi, Jayyusi, Nimr, Rayyan, Qasim, At'ut, al-Hajj Muhammad, Ghazi and Jaradat. Sanjaq Nablus comprised five nahiyas ("subsdistricts"): Jamma'in East (21 villages), Jamma'in West (25 villages), Mashariq Nablus (20 villages), Wadi al-Sha'ir (23 villages) and Sha'rawiyya (24 villages). Jamma'in East was headed by the Qasim clan, Jamma'in West by the Rayyan, Wadi al-Sha'ir by the Sayf and al-Ahfa clans, Mashariq Nablus by the Hajj Muhammad clan and Sha'rawiyya by the Abd al-Hadi clan. The Tuqan, Nimr and Abd al-Hadi families controlled Nablus.

The District of Nablus was economically active in growing olives which they used to produce olive oil, olive wood baskets and Nabulsi soap. Cotton was also a major cash crop. Most economic activity was based in Nablus, however the surrounding towns and villages supplied the crude product. The ruling families completely controlled all production soap and olive oil and the exporting of cotton, while the peasantry served as the farmers, laborers and were forced to pay taxes to the families. In return, the ruling families protected the villages and met municipal needs.

During the British Mandate, the Nablus District consisted of all of the present-day Nablus Governorate, southern portions of the Qalqilya Governorate, the entire Tubas Governorate, northern portions of the Salfit Governorate and the northern Jericho Governorate.

See also 
Abd al-Hadi Palace
Touqan Palace
Jacir Palace
Al-Nimr Palace

References

Bibliography

 

Nablus
States and territories established in 1549
Sanjaks of Ottoman Syria
1549 establishments in the Ottoman Empire
1918 disestablishments in the Ottoman Empire